The following is a partial list of Recorded Texas Historic Landmarks (RTHLs) arranged by county as designated by the Texas Historical Commission and local county historical commissions in Texas. This page includes RTHLs in the following counties: Eastland, Ector, Edwards, El Paso, Ellis, Erath, Falls, Fannin, Fayette, Fisher, Floyd, Foard, Fort Bend, Franklin, Freestone, Frio, Gaines, Galveston, Garza, Gillespie, Glasscock, Goliad, Gonzales, and Gray.

KEY

Landmarks with multiple historic designations are colored according to their highest designation within the following hierarchy.

Eastland County

Ector County

Edwards County

El Paso County

Ellis County

Erath County

Falls County

Fannin County

Fayette County

Fisher County
There are currently no Recorded Texas Historic Landmarks listed within the county.

Floyd County

Foard County

Fort Bend County

Franklin County

Freestone County

Frio County

Gaines County

Galveston County

Garza County

Gillespie County

Glasscock County

Goliad County

Gonzales County

Gray County

See also

References

External links

 (Eastland-Gray)
Landmarks (Eastland-Gray)